Yorke Peninsula was an electoral district of the House of Assembly in the Australian state (colony until 1901) of South Australia from 1884 to 1902 and from 1915 to 1970.

The Yorke Peninsula area formed the newly created seat of Goyder at the 1970 election.

Members

Election results

References 

Former electoral districts of South Australia
1844 establishments in Australia
1902 disestablishments in Australia
1915 establishments in Australia
1970 disestablishments in Australia
Yorke Peninsula